Cugnoli is a comune and town in the province of Pescara, in the Abruzzo region of southern Italy.

The village existence is first recorded in the 12th century, and the medieval walls surrounding the original settlement can still be seen.

References

Cities and towns in Abruzzo